The 2015 Sky Blue FC season was the team's sixth season of existence. Sky Blue played the 2015 season in National Women's Soccer League, the top tier of women's soccer in the United States.

Team

Roster

Match results

Preseason

Regular season

Standings

Results summary

Results by round

Squad statistics
Source: NWSL

Key to positions: FW – Forward, MF – Midfielder, DF – Defender, GK – Goalkeeper

See also
 2015 National Women's Soccer League season
 2015 in American soccer

References

External links
 

Sky Blue FC
Sky Blue FC
NJ/NY Gotham FC seasons
Sky Blue FC